Gypsy Lore is a 1997 Hungarian drama film directed by Bence Gyöngyössy. It is an adaptation of King Lear. The film was selected as the Hungarian entry for the Best Foreign Language Film at the 71st Academy Awards, but was not accepted as a nominee.

Cast
 Đoko Rosić as Lovér (as Djoko Rossich)
 Mihály Szabados as Tamáska
 Silvia Pincu as Ilka (as Silvia Pinku)
 Diliana Dimitrova as Kukunda
 Violetta Koleva as Sarolta
 János Derzsi as János
 Sami Osman as Joszo
 Umer Dzemailji as Rostás
 Piroska Molnár as Máli

See also
 List of submissions to the 71st Academy Awards for Best Foreign Language Film
 List of Hungarian submissions for the Academy Award for Best Foreign Language Film

References

External links
 

1997 films
1997 drama films
Hungarian drama films
1990s Hungarian-language films
Films based on King Lear